Nagano Ariga (1860-1921) was a Japanese legal expert during the Meiji period. In addition to law, he also studied sociology at Tokyo Imperial University. During the Sino-Japanese war, he advised Field-Marshall Ōyama Iwao on issues of international law.

Works (partial list)

 La Chine Et La Grande Guerre Europeenne Au Point de Vue Du Droit International D'Apres Les Documents Officiels Du Gouvernement Chinois
 La guerre sino-japonaise au point de vue du droit international
 La Guerre Russo-Japoinaise 1904-1905

References

1860 births
1921 deaths
19th-century Japanese lawyers
20th-century Japanese lawyers
Date of birth missing